The Palamakia is a Greek folk dance from Zagorochoria and Tzoumerka in Greece. It is based on syrtos and the movements of the legs and arms.

See also
Music of Greece
Greek dances
Greek folk music

References
Musipedia: Παλαμάκια

Greek dances